The following films were shown at the 2010 Sundance Film Festival.

Documentary
 12th and Delaware
 A Small Act
 Bhutto
 Casino Jack and the United States of Money
 Family Affair
 Freedom Riders
 Gasland
 Jean-Michel Basquiat: The Radiant Child
 Joan Rivers: A Piece of Work
 Lucky
 My Perestroika
 The Oath
 Restrepo
 Russian Lessons
 Smash His Camera
 The Tillman Story
 Waiting for "Superman"

World Cinema - Documentary
 Enemies of the People
 A Film Unfinished
 His & Hers
 Kick in Iran
 Last Train Home
 The Red Chapel
 Russian Lessons
 Secrets of the Tribe
 Sins of My Father
 Space Tourists
 Waste Land

World Cinema - Dramatic
 All That I Love
 Animal Kingdom
 Boy
 Four Lions
 Grown Up Movie Star
 The Man Next Door
 Me Too
 Nuummioq
 Peepli Live
 Son of Babylon()
 Southern District
 The Temptation of St. Tony
 Undertow
 Vegetarian

Dramatic
 3 Backyards
 Blue Valentine
 Douchebag
 The Dry Land
 Happythankyoumoreplease
 Winter's Bone
 Hesher
 Holy Rollers
 Howl
 The Imperialists Are Still Alive!
 Lovers of Hate
 Night Catches Us
 Obselidia
 Skateland
 Sympathy for Delicious
 Welcome to the Rileys

Premieres
 Abel
 Cane Toads: The Conquest
 The Company Men
 Cyrus
 The Extra Man
 Get Low
 Jack Goes Boating
 The Killer Inside Me
 Nowhere Boy
 Please Give
 The Runaways
 The Shock Doctrine
 Twelve

NEXT <=>
 Armless
 Bass Ackwards
 Bilal's Stand
 The Freebie
 Homewrecker
 New Low
 One Too Many Mornings
 The Taqwacores

Midnight

 7 Days
 Buried
 Frozen
 High School
 The Perfect Host
 Splice
 Tucker & Dale vs. Evil
 The Violent Kind

Spotlight

Narrative
 A Prophet
 Bran Nue Dae
 Daddy Longlegs
 Enter the Void
 I Am Love
 Hilarious
 Lourdes
 Mother and Child
 New African Cinema (A collection of short films from multiple countries by Wanuri Kahiu, Dyana Gaye and Jenna Bass)
 Women Without Men

Documentary

 8: The Mormon Proposition
 Catfish
 Climate Refugees
 Countdown to Zero
 Life 2.0
 Teenage Paparazzo
 To Catch a Dollar: Muhammad Yunus Banks on America
 Winning Time: Reggie Miller vs. The New York Knicks

New Frontier

 All My Friends Are Funeral Singers
 Double Take
 Memories of Overdevelopment
 ODDSAC
 Pepperminta
 Utopia in Four Movements

References

External links
Sundance Film Festival Screening List

Sundance 2010
2010 films
Sundance films